TruStar is an Indian low-cost airline promoted by Turbo Aviation based in Hyderabad. The airline plans to launch operations by the second quarter of 2020 with Dornier 228 aircraft.

History
In December 2019, Turbo Aviation announced that it had secured a £100-million ($133.64 million) investment from a Business Group based in the UK for the launch of commuter air services under the third place of the UDAN scheme. The airline plans to start operations with the routes they have secured under UDAN. The airline plans to have a fleet of 10 ATR-72s, 10 Airbus A320 and 4 Dornier 228 aircraft.
In January 2019, under the third round of the Governments Regional Connectivity Scheme, the airline had been awarded four routes in Uttar Pradesh, three routes across the States of Andhra Pradesh, Chhattisgarh, Odisha, Telangana, Tamil Nadu, Karnataka and Goa. The airline will be the launch customer of the Dornier 228NG built in India at Kanpur by HAL into scheduled commercial services.

References 

Airlines of India